is a 2005 Japanese film directed by Toshiaki Toyoda. The film is a family drama concerning the Kyobashis, whose house rule is to not keep secrets from each other when asked a question directly.

Cast
 Kyōko Koizumi as Eriko Kyobashi
 Anne Suzuki as Mana Kyobashi (as An Suzuki)
 Itsuji Itao as Takashi Kyobashi
 Masahiro Hirota as Ko Kyobashi
 Jun Kunimura as Eriko's brother
 Asami Imajuku as Sacchin
 Eita as Tezuka
 Sonim as Mina
 Hiromi Nagasaku as Asako Iizuka
 Michiyo Ōkusu as Satoko Kinosaki

Awards
Kyōko Koizumi - Best Actress, 2006 - Blue Ribbon Awards
Kyōko Koizumi - Best Actress, 2006 - Nikkan Sports Film Awards

External links 
 

2005 films
2000s Japanese-language films
Films directed by Toshiaki Toyoda
Japanese drama films
2005 drama films
2000s Japanese films